, subtitled He Is a Ultimate Teacher, is a Japanese manga series, written and illustrated by Takeshi Azuma. It was serialized in Shogakukan's Weekly Shōnen Sunday magazine from November 2011 to March 2017, with its chapters compiled in twenty-six tankōbon volumes.

A-1 Pictures produced two short anime clips, serving as promotion for the manga, and a 24-episode anime television series adaptation, which was broadcast on Yomiuri TV from April to September 2015. In North America, the series has been licensed by Funimation.

Plot

The story follows Junichiro Kagami, whose sister Suzune is angry at him because of his complete disinterest in the real world. As Junichiro is interested in nothing but anime, manga and games, Suzune forces him to go on a job as a physics teacher substitute at the same high school from which he graduated. Junichiro proves himself a capable and hardworking teacher who comes with unorthodox methods based on the seemingly useless knowledge he obtained as an otaku to teach and motivate his students.

Media

Manga
Ultimate Otaku Teacher is written and illustrated by Takeshi Azuma. It was serialized in Shogakukan's Weekly Shōnen Sunday magazine, from the 2011 49th issue, released on October 2, 2011, to the 2017 18th issue, released on March 29, 2017. Shogakukan compiled its chapters in twenty-six tankōbon volumes, released from March 16, 2012 to April 18, 2017.

Volume list

Anime

Two short anime clips, serving as promotion for the manga have been released, and an anime television series was produced, all of them by A-1 Pictures. Masato Sato directed the series with scripts written by Atsushi Maekawa. Isao Sugimoto designed the characters and Ryuuichi Takada composed the music. The series aired from April 4 to September 26, 2015. From episodes 1 to 12, the first opening theme is "Youthful Dreamer" by TrySail, and the ending theme is "DREAMIN'" by Tokyo Performance Doll. From episodes 13 to 24, the second opening theme is "Vivid Brilliant door" by Sphere, and the ending theme is "MY ONLY ONE" by 9nine. Funimation has licensed the series in North America.

Notes

References

External links
Denpa Kyōshi - He Is a Ultimate Teacher manga at Web Sunday 

Aniplex
Comedy anime and manga
Funimation
Shogakukan franchises
Shogakukan manga
Shōnen manga
Slice of life anime and manga
Teaching anime and manga
Yomiuri Telecasting Corporation original programming
Otaku in fiction